The initials RSLP may refer to:

 Répondre s'il lui plaît, an archaic variant of the better known French phrase, RSVP
 Research Support Libraries Programme, a UK government funding programme 1999-2002
 Revolutionary Socialist Labor Party, an American Socialist party 1881-1883